B. poeppigii may refer to:

 Bromelia poeppigii, a Peruvian epiphyte
 Bufo poeppigii, a South American toad